Lodging may refer to:
 Lodging, a type of residential accommodation
 Lodging (agriculture), the bending over of the stems near the ground level in grain crops, which makes them very difficult to harvest

See also 
 Lodge (disambiguation)